The Trevi Fountain is an 18th-century fountain in the Trevi district in Rome, Italy, designed by Italian architect Nicola Salvi and completed by Giuseppe Pannini and several others.

The fountain has appeared in several films, including Roman Holiday (1953); Three Coins in the Fountain (1954); Federico Fellini's classic, La Dolce Vita (1960); Sabrina Goes to Rome (1998); and The Lizzie McGuire Movie (2003).

History before 1629
The fountain, at the junction of three roads, marks the terminal point of the "modern" —the revived , one of the aqueducts that supplied water to ancient Rome. (This scene is presented on the present fountain's façade.) This  led the water into the Baths of Agrippa. It served Rome for more than 400 years.

Name origin 
The name of the fountain derives from the Latin word trivium (intersection of three streets). The statue is located right in the center of 
Via De'Crocicchi, Via Poli and Via Delle Muratte.

Roman aqueducts 
During the sixth century, the aqueducts were not well maintained and the 14 functioning ones were damaged following the invasion of the Ostrogoths.

The virgin water aqueduct carries the water to the Trevi fountain, after having collected it 10 km from the Italian capital.

The aqueduct is still in use today, despite some interventions during which the fountain remained empty. Calcium-free water is thought to be one of the causes.

Commission, construction, and design 

In 1629, Pope Urban VIII, finding the earlier fountain insufficiently dramatic, asked Gian Lorenzo Bernini to sketch possible renovations, but the project was abandoned when the pope died. Though Bernini's project was never constructed, there are many Bernini touches in the fountain as it exists today. An early influential model by Pietro da Cortona, preserved in the Albertina, Vienna, also exists, as do various early 18th century sketches, most unsigned, as well as a project attributed to Nicola Michetti one attributed to Ferdinando Fuga and a French design by Edmé Bouchardon.  

Competitions had become popular during the Baroque era to design buildings, fountains, as well as the Spanish Steps. In 1730, Pope Clement XII organized a contest in which Nicola Salvi initially lost to Alessandro Galilei – but due to the outcry in Rome over a Florentine having won, Salvi was awarded the commission anyway. Work began in 1732.

Salvi died in 1751 with his work half finished, but he had made sure a barber's unsightly sign would not spoil the ensemble, hiding it behind a sculpted vase, called by Romans the asso di coppe, the "Ace of Cups", because of its resemblance to a Tarot card. Four different sculptors were hired to complete the fountain's decorations: Pietro Bracci (whose statue of Oceanus sits in the central niche), Filippo della Valle, Giovanni Grossi, and Andrea Bergondi. Giuseppe Pannini (1718-1805), son of Giovanni Paolo Panini, was hired as architect.

The Trevi Fountain was finished in 1762 by Pannini, who substituted the present allegories for planned sculptures of Agrippa and Trivia, the Roman virgin. It was officially opened and inaugurated on 22 May by Pope Clement XIII.

Restoration
The fountain was refurbished once in 1988 to remove discoloration caused by smog, and again in 1998; the stonework was scrubbed and all cracks and other areas of deterioration were repaired by skilled artisans, and the fountain was equipped with recirculating pumps.

In January 2013, it was announced that the Italian fashion company Fendi would sponsor a 20-month, 2.2-million-euro restoration of the fountain; it was to be the most thorough restoration in the fountain's history.

Restoration work began in June 2014 and was completed in November 2015. The fountain was reopened with an official ceremony on the evening of 3 November 2015. The restoration included the installation of more than 100 LED lights to improve the nighttime illumination of the fountain.

Iconography

The backdrop for the fountain is the Palazzo Poli, given a new façade with a giant order of Corinthian pilasters that link the two main storeys. Taming of the waters is the theme of the gigantic scheme that tumbles forward, mixing water and rockwork, and filling the small square. Tritons guide Oceanus's shell chariot, taming hippocamps.

In the centre, a robustly-modelled triumphal arch is superimposed on the palazzo façade. The centre niche or exedra framing Oceanus has free-standing columns for maximal light and shade. In the niches flanking Oceanus, Abundance spills water from her urn and Salubrity holds a cup from which a snake drinks. Above, bas reliefs illustrate the Roman origin of the aqueducts.

The Tritons and horses provide symmetrical balance, with the maximum contrast in their mood and poses (by 1730, Rococo was already in full bloom in France and Germany).

Coin throwing
Coins are purportedly meant to be thrown using the right hand over the left shoulder. This was the theme of 1954's Three Coins in the Fountain and the Academy Award-winning song by that name which introduced the picture.

An estimated 3,000 euros are thrown into the fountain each day. In 2016, an estimated €1.4 million (US$1.5 million) was thrown into the fountain. The money has been used to subsidize a supermarket for Rome's needy; however, there are regular attempts to steal coins from the fountain, even though it is illegal to do so.

Gallery

In popular culture 

The Trevi Fountain is depicted in the third movement, "The Trevi Fountain at Noon", of Ottorino Respighi's 1916 symphonic poem Fountains of Rome.

In Federico Fellini's 1960 film La Dolce Vita, Anita Ekberg wades into the fountain with Marcello Mastroianni.

In 1973, the Italian national postal service dedicated a postage stamp to the Trevi Fountain.

In the 2003 film The Lizzie McGuire Movie, Lizzie tossed a coin into the Trevi Fountain to wish for smooth sailing in her coming high school years.

See also
 List of fountains in Rome

References

External links

 Engraving of the fountain's more modest predecessor.
 Roman Bookshelf – Trevi Fountain – Views from the 18th and 19th centuries
 Trevi Fountain Live Cam
 Trevi Fountain Virtual 360° panorama and photo gallery.

Fountains in Rome
Infrastructure completed in 1762
Sculptures in Italy
Baroque architecture in Rome
Rome R. II Trevi
Sculptures of gods
Horses in art
Musical instruments in art
Seashells in art
1762 establishments in Italy
Alessandro Galilei buildings

ms:Air Pancut Trevi